Nicole Flagothier (born 9 January 1966) is a Belgian judoka. She competed in the women's lightweight event at the 1992 Summer Olympics.

References

External links
 
 
 

1966 births
Living people
Belgian female judoka
Olympic judoka of Belgium
Judoka at the 1992 Summer Olympics
Sportspeople from Liège